George Anthony Haygarth (4 February 1945 – 10 March 2017) was an English television, film and theatre actor.

Life and career
After leaving Marlborough College, Liverpool, Haygarth worked unsuccessfully in 1963 as a lifeguard in Torquay, and also tried escapology, equally unsuccessfully. Other jobs included psychiatric nursing and he was an amateur actor before turning professional and appearing in repertory theatre, followed by the Royal Shakespeare Company and the National Theatre.

Haygarth played a milkman in Whatever Happened to the Likely Lads and made his film debut in the comedy film Percy (1971), from then on playing many roles in police and historical dramas, as well as situation comedies. He was normally cast as a solid, reliable character with a down-to-earth attitude. From 1977 to 1981 he played PC Wilmot in Roy Clarke's series Rosie. He played Milo Renfield in Dracula (1979) opposite Frank Langella, Donald Pleasence and Laurence Olivier.

Haygarth played the title role in Kinvig (1981), a science-fiction comedy series produced by London Weekend Television, Boys from the Blackstuff (1982) as a docker, Shoestring, series 1 episode 1, the swindling but loveable Sanchez in Farrington of the F.O. (1986–87) and in 2005 appeared in the television adaptation of Under the Greenwood Tree. He also played leading character Vic Snow in the ITV series Where the Heart Is from 1997 to 2002.

Haygarth's work in theatre included The Tempest and Twelve Angry Men in 1996, for both of which he was nominated for Laurence Olivier Theatre Awards for Best Actor in a Supporting Role; he was also the author of several plays. He won the Clarence Derwent Award for Simpatico (1995). His first play, The Lie, dealt with the death of Shakespeare's rival Christopher Marlowe.
In 1995 he appeared in Our Friends In The North as Roy Johnson, a police officer attempting to uncover police corruption.
He also appeared in Inspector Morse ("Daughters of Cain") as Ted Brooks, as well as two episodes of Sharpe (Sharpe’s Enemy and Sharpe's Justice).
His films included Chicken Run and Fakers. In 2008 he played Alfred Doolittle in The Old Vic's production of Pygmalion. In November 2008 he joined the cast of Emmerdale as Mick Naylor. In 2010 he appeared in the London production of Little Voice, as Mr Boo. He appeared in the role of Peter Cooper in an episode of New Tricks (BBC1) (Series 8: 10 - Tiger Tiger) first shown 5 September 2011.

Other interests
Haygarth was also a scholar of Shakespeare's Dark Lady, an unidentified character in the Sonnets. He analysed a Nicholas Hilliard portrait, Mistress Holland, concluding that it was in fact of Emilia Lanier, a candidate for the identity of The Dark Lady. His play Dark Meaning Mouse features Emilia, Shakespeare and Simon Forman.

Death and family
Haygarth died from the complications of Alzheimer's disease on 10 March 2017 at his home in Royal Tunbridge Wells, Kent. At the time of his death, he was divorced from Carole Winter with whom he had two daughters, Katie and Becky.

Selected filmography

 Percy (1971) - Purdey
 Unman, Wittering and Zigo (1971) - Cary Farthingale 
 The Love Ban (1973) - Policeman #2
 Last of the Summer Wine (1973) - Chip Simmonite
 I, Claudius (1976, TV Mini-Series) - Claudius' Slave
 Rachel and the Beelzebub Bombardiers (1977) - Reformed drunkard
 Holocaust (1978, TV Mini-Series) - Heinz Muller
 Let's Get Laid (1978) - Sgt. Costello
 Dracula (1979) - Milo Renfield
 S.O.S. Titanic (1979, TV movie) - Engineer Officer (uncredited)
 The Human Factor (1979) - Buffy
 McVicar (1980) - Rabies Pendel
 Outside In (1981)
 Ivanhoe (1982, TV Movie) - Friar Tuck
 Two Gentlemen of Verona (1983, TV Movie) - Launce
 Britannia Hospital (1982) - Fraser: The Workers
 A Private Function (1984) - Sutcliff
 The Bride (1985) - Tavern Keeper
 Dreamchild (1985) - Mad Hatter (voice)
 Clockwise (1986) - Ivan with the Tractor
 A Month in the Country (1987) - Douthwaite
 Hardwicke House (1987 TV series originally cancelled after first two episodes aired, remaining five uploaded to YouTube in 2019) - Mr Savage
 The Most Dangerous Man in the World (1988) - Yildirim
 The Dressmaker (1988) - Mr. Manders
 Tree of Hands (1989) - Kostas
 London Kills Me (1991) - Burns
 Between The Lines (TV series) (1992) - Colin Keogh
 The Trial (1993) - Willem
 Prince of Jutland (1994) - Ragnar
 Sharpe (TV Series) (1994) - Pot Au Feu
 Swept from the Sea (1997) - Mr. Smith
 The Woodlanders (1997) - Mr. Melbury
 Chicken Run (2000) - Mr. Tweedy (voice)
 Midsomer Murders ("Destroying Angel") (2001) - Tyson
 Fakers (2004) - Phil Norris
 Ghostboat (2006, TV Movie) - Cassidy
 Midsomer Murders ("King’s Crystal") (2007) - Jack Tewson
 Wild at Heart ("Series 2 Episode 5") (2007) - Bash
 New Tricks ("Tiger Tiger") (2011) - Peter Cooper
 Midsomer Murders ("A Rare Bird") (2012) - George Napier

References

External links

1945 births
2017 deaths
English male stage actors
English male television actors
Male actors from Liverpool
Shakespearean scholars
English male Shakespearean actors
Deaths from dementia in England
Deaths from Alzheimer's disease